Salif Nogo (born 1 January 1986) is a Burkinabé-French former professional footballer who played as a centre back. Nogo started his career in Burkina Faso at US Ouagadougou, then in 2006 arrived in Romania, at Oțelul Galați. Then, for the next 16 years Salif played at all the levels of the Romanian football, from Liga I to Liga IV, for teams from almost all the historical regions of the country. Among the clubs for which he played were Oțelul Galați, Jiul Petroșani, Politehnica Iași, Astra Ploiești, Luceafărul Oradea, Unirea Dej or Lotus Băile Felix.

Career
Nogo was born in Ouagadougou. He previously played for Oțelul Galați, Jiul Petroşani, Politehnica Iaşi and Astra Giurgiu. in the Romanian Liga I He also had a short experience playing in France at ES Troyes AC.

Honours
Lotus Băile Felix
Liga IV: 2018–19

References

External links
 
 
 
 
 

1986 births
Living people
Sportspeople from Ouagadougou
Association football central defenders
Burkinabé footballers
Burkina Faso international footballers
US Ouagadougou players
ES Troyes AC players
CSM Jiul Petroșani players
FC Politehnica Iași (1945) players
ASC Oțelul Galați players
FC Astra Giurgiu players
CS Sportul Snagov players
CS Luceafărul Oradea players
FC Unirea Dej players
CSM Deva players
Liga I players
Liga II players
Liga III players
Burkinabé expatriate sportspeople in France
Burkinabé expatriate sportspeople in Romania
Burkinabé expatriate footballers
Expatriate footballers in Romania
21st-century Burkinabé people